Kaashidhoo Kuda Kandu is a channel in the Maldives. Since the island of Kaashidhoo is located in the midst of the Kaashidhoo Kandu, or Kardiva Channel it is often referred to as having two parts with Kuda Kaashidhoo Kandu as the channel south of Kaashidhoo island.

See also
Kardiva Channel
Kaashidhoo Bodu Kandu

References
 Divehiraajjege Jōgrafīge Vanavaru. Muhammadu Ibrahim Lutfee. G.Sōsanī.

Channels of the Maldives
Channels of the Indian Ocean